This is a list of yearly Tri-State Conference football standings.

Tri-State Conference football standings

NAIA (1960–1969)

NAIA Division II (1970–1980)

References

Tri-State Conference (1960-1981)
Tri-State Conference (1960-1981)
Standings